Domantovo is a rural locality (a village) in Kisnemskoye Rural Settlement, Vashkinsky District, Vologda Oblast, Russia. The population was 1 as of 2002.

Geography 
Domantovo is located 49 km west of Lipin Bor (the district's administrative centre) by road. Parshino is the nearest rural locality.

References 

Rural localities in Vashkinsky District